Johannes Sillenberg (29 September 1890 Puurmani Parish (now Põltsamaa Parish), Kreis Dorpat – 27 June 1978) was an Estonian politician. He was a member of II Riigikogu. He was a member of the Riigikogu since 17 May 1924, representing the Workers' United Front. He replaced August Mühlberg. On 4 June 1924, he resigned his position and he was replaced by Gustav Lange.

References

1890 births
1978 deaths
People from Põltsamaa Parish
People from Kreis Dorpat
Workers' United Front politicians
Members of the Riigikogu, 1923–1926